Cross Keys is an unincorporated community in Sussex County, Delaware, United States. Cross Keys is southwest of Millsboro.

References

Unincorporated communities in Sussex County, Delaware
Unincorporated communities in Delaware